Behroze Sabzwari (born 1957) is an actor from Pakistan, appearing in films, on television, and in voice acting roles alike.

Career
Behroze began his career in Radio Pakistan as a radio presenter. In the late 1970s, he started his acting career by starring in a "live" television children's play Dadajan Nanajan. Behroze has appeared in a number of television commercials. He has also done many stage plays, including Mirza Ghalib Bandar Road Par. Mirza Ghalib Bandar Road Par was the famous play of Khawaja Moinuddin. This play was the earliest of Behroze's plays and introduced him to the TV viewers throughout Pakistan in the early seventies. However, he achieved fame through the PTV play Khuda Ki Basti in 1974 where he played the role of Nausha.

Behroze Sabzwari received the Pride of Performance on 23 March 2009, for his services to the Pakistani television industry for more than 40 years.

Personal life

During the PTV serial era, he became known for his role of playing Qabacha in the drama series Tanhaiyaan, with Bollywood actor Raj Kapoor also having acknowledged him.

Television plays

 
 Mandi
 Pyar Agar Kabhi Phir Hua (PTV long Play)
 Zara Si Aurat
 2010: Daam as Haji Saab
 2011: Anokha Ladla
 2012: Meray Dard Ko Jo Zuban Miley as Ahmed Ali
 2012: Tanhaiyan Naye Silsilay as Qabacha
 2012: Roshan Sitara as Ashfaq
 2013: Aise Jalay Jiya Hum TV
 2013: Kankar Hum TV
 2014: Susraal Mera
 2015: Gul-e-Rana as Abdul Aziz (Father Role of Sajal Ali) Hum TV
 2015: Mera Naam Yousuf Hai as Waji Ahmed (Father role of Imran Abbas)
 2015: Karb as Fahad Hum TV
 2015: Diyar-e-Dil as Tajamal Hum TV
 2017: Zard Zamano Ka Sawera ARY Digital
 2017: Baby
 2017: Tau Dil Ka Kia Hua Hum TV
 2018: Bay Dardi ARY Digital
 2018: Naulakha
 2019: Azaab-e-Zindagi  as Hanzal
 2020: Bheegi Palkain
2020: Bhabi Nazar Laga Dengi (Zulfiqar) ARY Digital
2021: Hona Tha Pyar (Sharaafat Ali) Hum TV

Filmography

References

External links
 
 Behroze Sabzwari Profile – Pakistan Television

1957 births
Living people
Pakistani male television actors
Pakistani male film actors
Pakistani male comedians
Male actors from Karachi
Recipients of the Pride of Performance
Male actors in Urdu cinema